Italian ship Giuseppe Garibaldi may refer to:

 
 , armoured cruiser
 , light cruiser, recommissioned in 1961 as guided missile cruiser
 , launched in 1983; commissioned on 30 September 1985; is in service as flagship of Marina Militare

All the ships named Giuseppe Garibaldi had as motto "Obbedisco".

Italian Navy ship names